Henry Poole is a technologist and social entrepreneur, CEO of CivicActions and Board Member of the Free Software Foundation.

He co-founded one of the first digital agencies, Vivid Studios, in 1993.  That year, he served as technical editor for the book, Demystifying Multimedia. In 1994, he led a project to study the social interactions and use of technology for the WELL community. In 1995, his firm managed the online launch of Microsoft Windows 95 (the largest online technology product introduction of this time).

In 2000, Poole joined as CEO of French Linux publisher MandrakeSoft. In 2001, Poole founded the first openSAAS enterprise, Affero, Inc.  and in 2002, published the Affero General Public License, version 1. Poole joined the board of the Free Software Foundation in December 2002. In 2003, Poole managed the digital team for Kucinich for US President and in 2004, founded government digital services firm CivicActions. In May 2006, Poole and the Free Software Foundation launched the anti-DRM campaign, Defective by Design.

A software freedom activist, Poole has organized fundraisers for Dmitry Sklyarov and the Free Software Foundation.

He is a signatory to the 9/11 Truth Statement.

References

External links
Henry Poole CivicActions Bio
Politics on the Net
Berkeley Technophiles Launch Campaign Software Revolution
Presidential Campaigning at the Edge
The Affero GPL: Closing the Distribution Loophole
Famed Berkeley Home Hosts Kucinich E-campaign
LinuxPlanet Interview: Trust Unlimited
Technical Entrepreneur Profile - Henri Poole: Bridging Worlds
Financial Times: Building communities on the internet
BusinessWeek: Yankee, We Want You. Yankee, Go Home
Scoop Media: Where is the Money

Members of the Free Software Foundation board of directors
GNU people
Year of birth missing (living people)
Living people